The 2022 Astana Open was a professional men's tennis tournament to be held on indoor hard courts. It was the third edition of the Astana Open and part of the ATP Tour 500 Series of the 2022 ATP Tour.

The event was held on a third consecutive year in the alternative sporting calendar, but it was upgraded to the ATP 500 level following the cancellation of tournaments in China in 2022 because of the ongoing COVID-19 pandemic. The tournament took place in Astana, Kazakhstan, from 3–9 October. The women's event was discontinued this year.

Champions

Singles

  Novak Djokovic def.  Stefanos Tsitsipas 6–3, 6–4
 It was Djokovic's 4th title of the year and the 90th of his career.

Doubles

  Nikola Mektić /  Mate Pavić def.  Adrian Mannarino /  Fabrice Martin, 6–4, 6–2

Singles main draw entrants

Seeds

 Rankings are as of September 26, 2022.

Other entrants
The following players received wildcards into the singles main draw:
  Novak Djokovic
  Mikhail Kukushkin 
  Stan Wawrinka
  Beibit Zhukayev

The following player received entry as a special exempt:
  Marc-Andrea Hüsler

The following players received entry from the qualifying draw:
  Laslo Đere
  Luca Nardi 
  Alexander Shevchenko 
  Zhang Zhizhen

The following players received entry as lucky losers:
  David Goffin
  Pavel Kotov

Withdrawals
  Nikoloz Basilashvili → replaced by  Albert Ramos Viñolas
  Grigor Dimitrov → replaced by  Adrian Mannarino
  Gaël Monfils → replaced by  Oscar Otte
  Lorenzo Musetti → replaced by  Emil Ruusuvuori
  Holger Rune → replaced by  David Goffin
  Diego Schwartzman → replaced by  Alexander Bublik
  Jannik Sinner → replaced by  Pavel Kotov
  Lorenzo Sonego → replaced by  Tallon Griekspoor

Doubles main draw entrants

Seeds

 Rankings are as of September 26, 2022

Other entrants
The following pairs received wildcards into the doubles main draw: 
  Alexander Bublik /  Beibit Zhukayev 
  Grigoriy Lomakin /  Denis Yevseyev

The following pair received entry from the qualifying draw:
  Diego Hidalgo /  Cristian Rodríguez

Withdrawals
  Marcelo Arévalo /  Jean-Julien Rojer → replaced by  Francisco Cerúndolo /  Andrés Molteni
  Juan Sebastian Cabal /  Robert Farah → replaced by  Adrian Mannarino /  Fabrice Martin
  Wesley Koolhof /  Neal Skupski → replaced by  Andrey Golubev /  Aleksandr Nedovyesov
  Rajeev Ram /  Joe Salisbury → replaced by  Kevin Krawietz /  Andreas Mies

References

External links
Official website

Astana Open
Astana Open
Astana Open